Marpak is a village development committee in Dhading District in the Bagmati Zone of central Nepal. At the time of the 1991 Nepal census it had a population of 3987 and had 718 houses in it.

References

Populated places in Dhading District